Hillsboro High School is a public high school located in Hillsboro, Missouri. It is the only high school in the Hillsboro R-3 School District.

About

Hillsboro High school has approximately 1,140 students of which only 3% are from ethnic minorities. 25% of the student body is economically disadvantaged and the school scored 80% proficient in reading and 47% in math.

Controversy
In September 2015, the high school experienced a large number of parents and students protesting against the right of a pre-operation transgender student, Lila Perry, to use the girls' locker room and restrooms. Students of the High school started a walkout in support of banning Lily Perry from the girls' bathroom and locker room. Perry was offered a separate gender-neutral bathroom in response to her request. Many of the students that participated in the walkout did so simply to leave school.

References 

High schools in Jefferson County, Missouri
Public high schools in Missouri
Education in Jefferson County, Missouri